Ingwelde (minor planet designation: 561 Ingwelde) is a Themistian asteroid. In light of Max Wolf's practice ca. 1905 of naming his discoveries after operatic heroines, it is most likely named after the title character of Ingwelde, an opera by Max von Schillings premiered in Karlsruhe in 1894.

References

External links 
 
 

000561
Discoveries by Max Wolf
Named minor planets
000561
19050326